Lemniscomys, sometimes known as striped grass mice or zebra mice, is a genus of murine rodents from Africa. Most species are from Sub-Saharan Africa; L. barbarus is the only found north of the Sahara. They are generally found in grassy habitats, but where several species overlap in distribution there is a level of habitat differentiation between them.

The pelage pattern of the species fall into three main groups: The "true" zebra mice with distinct dark and pale stripes (L. barbarus, L. hoogstraali and L. zebra), the spotted grass mice with more spotty/interrupted stripes (L. bellieri, L. macculus, L. mittendorfi and L. striatus), and the single-striped grass mice with only a single dark stripe along the back (L. griselda, L. linulus, L. rosalia and L. roseveari).

They are generally considered diurnal, but at least some species can be active during the night. They feed on plants, but sometimes take insects.  There are up to 12 young per litter, but 4–5 is more common. The average life expectancy is very short, in the wild often only a year, but a captive L. striatus lived for almost 5 years. A more typical captive life expectancy is 2–2½ years.

While most are common and not threatened, L. mittendorfi is restricted to Mount Oku and considered Vulnerable by the IUCN. L. hoogstraali and L. roseveari are both very poorly known, leading to their rating as Data Deficient. Some of the widespread species are regularly kept in captivity, especially L. barbarus, L. striatus and L. zebra.

Systematics

Lemniscomys currently includes 11 species. Until 1997, L. zebra was generally treated as a subspecies of L. barbarus. It is possible L. striatus and L. zebra, as presently defined, actually are species complexes.

 Lemniscomys barbarus  — Barbary striped grass mouse
 Lemniscomys bellieri  — Bellier's striped grass mouse
 Lemniscomys griselda  — Griselda's striped grass mouse
 Lemniscomys hoogstraali  — Hoogstraal's striped grass mouse
 Lemniscomys linulus  — Senegal one-striped grass mouse
 Lemniscomys macculus  — Buffoon striped grass mouse
 Lemniscomys mittendorfi  — Mittendorf's striped grass mouse
 Lemniscomys rosalia  — single-striped grass mouse
 Lemniscomys roseveari — Rosevear's striped grass mouse
 Lemniscomys striatus  — typical striped grass mouse
 Lemniscomys zebra  — Heuglin's striped grass mouse

References

External links

Lemniscomys entry in Animal Diversity Web
Lemniscomys entry in "The Taxonomican (does not include the species Lemniscomys zebra)
Lemniscomys zebra entry in "Zipcode Zoo" (with links to entries for other Lemniscomys species and subspecies)

Lemniscomys